Kunaari was an 18th-century kingdom in what is now central Mali. It merged into the Massina Empire in the early 19th century. Fatoma was the capital of Kunaari.

References

Countries in precolonial Africa
Political history of Mali